The 13th Assembly elections were held in Maharashtra, India on October 13, 2009. The ruling Democratic Front (Congress and Nationalist Congress Party (NCP)) contested the elections against the alliance of Shiv Sena and Bharatiya Janata Party (BJP) and Against the Third Front Known as Republican Left Democratic Front popularly known as RIDALOS.

Voters elected the 288 members of the Maharashtra Legislative Assembly in newly organized assembly constituencies after the delimitation approved in 2008. The results were declared on October 22, 2009.

State on a halt for the most eventful day
In view of the General Assembly Elections in Maharashtra, the Government of Maharashtra via its notification dated September 29, 2009 declared the day of Polling i.e. Tuesday, October 13, 2009, a Public Holiday in the State under section 25 of the Negotiable Instruments Act, 1881.

Election day

Overall polling
About 60% of polling was recorded in Maharashtra. In the island city of Mumbai, near about 48% of the total registered voters exercised their franchise. The turnout was slightly better in suburban Mumbai at 52%. Elsewhere in Maharashtra, approximately 60% of the total voters participated in the polling. Congress-MNS worker clashes were reported in Nashik and police had to fire in air to disperse the mob.

Naxal scare in Gadchiroli
Voting in at least 11 polling stations in two Assembly constituencies, Aheri and Armori of Gadchiroli District was delayed until 2 pm (14:00 hrs IST) following a scare early on the election day when Naxals opened fire in the area. Around 9:30 hrs IST, Naxals fired in Bondhai village in the district, despite the presence of stringent security in the Maoist infested districts of eastern Maharashtra's Vidarbha region.

Predictions
Various news agencies and exit polls had predicted the future outcome of the elections.

Election statistics
Voter Turnout: 60%
Number of constituencies: 288
Number of candidates: 3,559, including 211 women
Electors: Male 3,97,34,776, Female 3,60,76,469, Total 7,58,11,245
Polling stations: 84,136
Constituency with maximum candidates: Aurangabad East - 28
Constituency with minimum number of candidates: Dahanu (ST) and Islampur - 4 each
Biggest constituency electorate-wise: Chinchwad (391,644 electors)
Smallest constituency electorate-wise: Kudal (186,185 electors)

Party-wise no.of Candidates:

Indian National Congress 171, Nationalist Congress Party 112, Shiv Sena 160, Bharatiya Janata Party 119, Republican Left Democratic Front RIDALOS 200, MNS 145, BSP  281, Communist Party of India 21, Communist Party of India (Marxist) 19, RJD <--??-->1, Independents + others 2,675 news.outlookindia.com | Assembly Elections: 66% Turnout, 1 Killed

List of Political Parties participated in 2009 Maharashtra Assembly Elections.

Results

Final results chart

City Wise Results

Type-wise results

Division-wise results

District-wise results

Region-wise break up

Results by constituency

Notes

References

External links 
Statistical Report on General Election, 2009 to the Legislative Assembly of Maharashtra
Maharashtra Assembly Elections - Official Results
Maharashtra Assembly Elections - Sify

State Assembly elections in Maharashtra
2000s in Maharashtra
2009 State Assembly elections in India